Loliwe (English: The Train) is the debut studio album by South African singer Zahara, released on 6 September 2011. The album's production was handled by Robbie Malinga and Mojalefa Thebe. It was supported by two singles: "Loliwe" and "Ndiza", and features a guest appearance from Georgyn Kanana. It sold over 20,000 copies and reached gold status within 72 hours of its release. Four weeks after it was released, it sold 210,000 copies in South Africa. Furthermore, Loliwe sold 350,000 copies after four months of being on the market. It is the second fastest selling album in South African history behind Brenda Fassie's Memeza, which sold over 500,000 copies.

Background
Zahara wrote most of the songs for the album prior to signing a record deal with TS Records in August 2010. In her songs, she references apartheid activists like Walter Sisulu, Nelson Mandela and Helen Joseph. The title track "Loliwe" refers to the train that brought workers back home after many years of working in Johannesburg, where they often had other families. In an interview, Zahara described the album as a "metaphor" and further said, "It's like ... just pick yourself up. No matter who's your father or who's your mother ... I believe that you're not a mistake."

Singles
TS Records released the album's lead single "Loliwe" on 31 August 2011. Its accompanying music video was produced by Mastermax Films. "Ndiza" was released as the album's second single on 25 November 2011. Zahara describes the song as "a place one goes to make their heart pure". The music video for the song was also directed by Ash Dibben.

Critical reception

Loliwe received widespread acclaim from music critics. Simah of MOMIX gave the album an 8 out of 10, stating, "The album actually proves the opinions I've been hearing about it. And it serves as one of the most powerful debuts by a South African woman. She certainly possesses the golden touch because her talent is enough to make her shine and reach for her destiny." Claire Martens of Music Review South Africa assigned a normalized score of 92 out of 100, adding, "Set against the strumming of her guitar and the infusion of African-style beats, the music tends towards simplicity and integrity. Having said that, the album is not perfect. I thought the song “My Guitar” was her weakest offering and inappropriately placed. I also felt like the first part of album is stronger than the rest, “Umthwalo” and “Loliwe” being the pinnacle, throwing the rest of the album off kilter. Bar this, Loliwe comes close to perfection."

Accolades
Loliwe won Best Selling Album, Album of the Year and Best Smooth Urban Music Album at the 18th Annual South African Music Awards. It was nominated for Best Produced Album and won Best Female Album at the 2011 Metro FM Music Awards.

Track listing

Personnel
Georgyn Kanana - Featured artist
Robbie Malinga - Producer
Mojalefa Thebe - Producer

Release history

References

2011 debut albums
Xhosa-language albums
Zahara (South African musician) albums